The Banco Central burglary at Fortaleza was the theft of about R$160 million from the vault of the Banco Central branch located in Fortaleza, in the state of Ceará, Brazil, on August 6, 2005. It is one of the world's largest heists.
In the aftermath of the burglary, of the 25 people thought to be involved, only 8 had been arrested, and R$20 million recovered, up to the end of 2005. In addition, several of the gang are thought to have been victims of kidnapping, and one member, Luis Fernando Ribeiro, thought to have been the mastermind of the operation, was killed by kidnappers after a ransom was paid.
Arrests and recovery of the money, as well as kidnapping and murder of the perpetrators, have been ongoing. One hundred and twenty nine arrests were made, and 32 million Reais were recovered. The Brazilian Federal Police was also able to prevent other burglaries, as shown in the Netflix documentary "3 Tonelada$: Assalto ao Banco Central".

The burglary
On Saturday, August 6, 2005, a gang of burglars tunneled into the bank and removed five containers of 50-real notes, with an estimated value of R$164,755,150 (about 71.6 million USD at 2005 exchange rate) and weighing about 3.5 tons. The money was uninsured, a bank spokesperson stating that the risks were too small to justify the insurance premiums. The burglars managed to evade or disable the bank's internal alarms and sensors, and the burglary remained undiscovered until the bank opened for business the following Monday.

Banco Central is the Brazilian central bank, charged with control of the money supply. The money in the vault was to be examined to decide whether it should be recirculated or destroyed. The bills were not numbered sequentially, making them almost impossible to trace.

Planning
Three months before the burglary, the criminals rented a commercial property in the center of the city and tunneled 78 meters (256 ft) beneath two city blocks to a position beneath the bank.  The gang had renovated the property and put up a sign indicating it was a landscaping company selling both natural and artificial grass as well as plants. Neighbors, who estimated that the gang consisted of between six and ten men, described how they had seen van-loads of soil being removed daily, but understood this to be a normal activity of the business. The tunnel, being roughly 70 cm (2.3 ft) square and running 4 meters (13 ft) beneath the surface, was well-constructed: it was lined with wood and plastic and had its own lighting and air conditioning systems.

Execution
On the final weekend, the gang broke through 1.1 meters (3.6 ft) of steel-reinforced concrete to enter the bank vault. A considerable amount of time would be required to remove and transport the money due to the volume and weight of the amount that was taken.

Investigation
"They worked for several months", police said. "The gardening company was working since March. They had sophisticated equipment, including GPS, and experts in mathematics, engineering and excavation."

Police located a pick-up truck branded with a Grama Sintética (Synthetic Turf) logo found at the rented property.  Bolt cutters, a blow torch, an electric saw and other tools used to penetrate the concrete barrier were found both inside the vault and within the empty property. The property was covered in burnt lime to avoid fingerprints.

Suspects
The Brazilian Federal Police are investigating a possible connection between the burglars and car resellers in Fortaleza. On August 10, 2005, the Military Police of Minas Gerais arrested two men driving a car-carrying truck in Sete Lagoas, near Belo Horizonte, Minas Gerais. More than R$2.13 million was recovered in three pickup trucks being transported.

Five men were arrested on September 28, 2005, with about R$5.22 million of the money and told the police they had helped dig the tunnel. Eighteen suspects remain at large. Prosecutors have said the group tried unsuccessfully to charter a small plane days before the robbery to escape and move the money out of the country.

On October 20, 2005, the body of one of the alleged masterminds, Luis Fernando Ribeiro, 26, was found on an isolated road near Camanducaia, 200 miles (320 km) west of Rio de Janeiro. He had been shot seven times and had handcuff marks on his wrists. "It was definitely because of the robbery," according to a police official of Minas Gerais who identified himself only as Corporal Leonino. 

Ribeiro fled from Fortaleza to São Paulo after the robbery and was kidnapped on October 7, 2005. His family paid R$893,600 in ransom, but he was not freed. There were signs that police officers were involved in the kidnapping and killing, and three of them were arrested.

On October 28, 2005, a person linked to a former security guard involved in the burglary was arrested with R$85,100 and on November 10 three more suspects were arrested.

From October 22, 2005, until April 13, 2006, the police discovered six kidnappings related to this robbery and in all cases the relatives of the victims paid the ransom.

On August 1, 2006, Brazilian authorities found R$178,100 buried in a house in Natal, Rio Grande do Norte.

A prepaid phone card was found inside the tunnel. The Federal Police located the cell phone associated with it and had it wiretapped. On September 1, 2006, a special operation named "Operação Facção Toupeira" (Operation Mole Faction) was started, leading the police to arrest 43 people suspect of involvement on the heist including one of the alleged masterminds, and recovering R$275,100 in cash.

On October 3, 2006, the body of another suspect, Evandro José das Neves, was found at a favela in São Paulo.

On January 28, 2007, Márcio Rafael Pierre, another of the alleged masterminds, was arrested in São Paulo. On April 19, also in São Paulo, a suspect named Edson Pereira de Queiroz was arrested.

So far, authorities have arrested 54 suspects and the Federal Police recovered only about R$20 million.

See also

Knightsbridge Security Deposit robbery - a robbery of similar magnitude.
Assalto ao Banco Central (Central Bank Heist) - a movie based on the burglary
List of bank robbers and robberies

References

Folha de S.Paulo - News about all the Kidnappings (in Portuguese)
FOXNews
The New York Times story
BBC news story
Agencia Brasil story
Times online story - includes a picture of the tunnel
Bloomberg story
CNN online story
Banco Central do Brasil news release (in Portuguese)
News24 Online Story
Ireland On-Line Story
Rádio Brasil Central

2005 crimes in Brazil
Bank burglaries
Fortaleza